Gamlitz (Slovene: Gomilnica) is a municipality in the district of Leibnitz in Styria, Austria. In the first known document that mentions it (dated from 1145), the settlement is called Gomilnitz, a reference either to the Slavic gomilca which denotes a small hill, or to gom (a group or chain of hills); indeed Gamlitz is situated among and between rolling hills. The tradition of the local castle goes back to the year 1111.

References

External link

Cities and towns in Leibnitz District